Breakaway is the game for the 2010 FIRST Robotics Competition, announced on January 9, 2010. Robots direct soccer balls into goals, traverse "bumps" in the field, suspend themselves and each other on towers, and/or go through a tunnel located in the center of the field.

In 2010, a new driver station was introduced, the Classmate PC, replacing the previous Kwikbyte driver station.

Game overview

Scoring 
Balls are kicked or herded into goals located in the corners of the fields.  There are two goals for each alliance, adding up to 4 goals total.
Scored Ball  —  1 point

At the end of the match, bonus points are awarded for robots that cling onto either of the two towers in the center of the field. More bonus points are awarded if alliance robots can suspend themselves from the robot clinging onto the tower.
Suspended Bot  —  2 points
Bot Suspended From Another Bot  —  3 points

Game Play 

Robots play Breakaway on a 27 by 54-foot rectangular field known as the field. The field is bordered by a set of guardrails and alliance walls. There are two "bumps" in the field that divide it into three zones. During matches, the robots are controlled from alliance stations located outside the field at both ends. These rectangular zones consist of three-team player stations that provide connectivity between the controls used by the robot operators and the arena. Goals are located at the corners of the field, and extend behind the alliance wall and adjacent to the player stations. After goals are scored, human players must pick up the balls and pass them to the center of the alliance station to be placed on a ball return rack, after which they will re-enter play at midfield. Teams are penalized if balls are not re-entered within a set time limit.

Starting Positions 
Each round lasts two minutes and fifteen seconds. In the first fifteen seconds of a round, the robots run in autonomous mode, then there are two minutes of game play during which robots are user-controlled. The game is played by two three-robot alliances with each team starting one robot in each of the three sections of the field. At the beginning of a match, every robot must be touching either one of the bisecting bumps or an alliance wall. Also, at the start of the match each of the 12 balls in play must be placed at one vertex of a six foot by six foot grid. There are two grids marked at either ends of each of the three zones.

Competition schedule 
 Kickoff  —  January 9, 2010
 Shipping deadline  —  February 23, 2010
 Championship  —  April 15, 2010 - April 17, 2010

Seven different fields were built and played on.

Events

Regionals
The following regional events were held in 2010:

 Arizona Regional - Phoenix
 Autodesk Oregon Regional - Portland
 BAE Systems Granite State Regional - Manchester, NH
 Bayou Regional - Westwego, LA
 Boilermaker Regional - West Lafayette, IN
 Boston Regional - Boston
 Buckeye Regional - Cleveland, OH
 Chesapeake Regional - Baltimore, MD
 Colorado Regional - Denver
 Dallas Regional - Dallas
 Finger Lakes Regional - Rochester, NY
 Florida Regional - Orlando
 Greater Kansas City Regional - Kansas City, MO
 Greater Toronto Regional - Mississauga, ON
 Hawaii Regional - Honolulu
 Israel Regional - Tel Aviv, Israel
 Las Vegas Regional - Las Vegas
 Lone Star Regional - Houston
 Los Angeles Regional - Long Beach, CA
 Microsoft Seattle Regional - Seattle
 Midwest Regional - Chicago
 Minnesota 10000 Lakes Regional - Minneapolis
 Minnesota North Star Regional - Minneapolis
 New Jersey Regional - Trenton, NJ
 New York City Regional - New York City
 North Carolina Regional - Raleigh, NC
 Northeast Utilities FIRST Connecticut Regional - Hartford, CT
 Oklahoma Regional - Oklahoma City
 Palmetto Regional - Clemson, SC
 Peachtree Regional - Duluth, GA
 Philadelphia Regional - Philadelphia
 Pittsburgh Regional - Pittsburgh
 St. Louis Regional - St. Louis
 Sacramento Regional - Davis, CA
 San Diego Regional - San Diego
 SBPLI Long Island Regional - Hempstead, NY
 Silicon Valley Regional - San Jose, CA
 Utah Regional - Salt Lake City
 Virginia Regional - Richmond, VA
 Washington DC Regional - Washington, DC
 Waterloo Regional - Waterloo, ON
 Wisconsin Regional - Milwaukee
 WPI Regional - Worcester, MA

Districts
District events were held only in Michigan and led up to the Michigan State Championship in Ypsilanti.
 Kettering University FIRST Robotics District Competition - Flint
 Traverse City FIRST Robotics District Competition - Traverse City
 Ann Arbor FIRST Robotics District Competition - Ann Arbor
 Cass Tech FIRST Robotics District Competition - Detroit
 West Michigan FIRST Robotics District Competition - Allendale
 Detroit FIRST Robotics District Competition - Detroit
 Troy FIRST Robotics District Competition - Troy

World Championships
The World Championships were held at the Georgia Dome in Atlanta, Georgia. Attendance was estimated to be around 20,000 at that all-seater stadium.

Final round at Einstein Field

References

External links

2010 in robotics
FIRST Robotics Competition games